E is the third note and the fifth semitone of the C major scale, and mi in fixed-do solfège. It has enharmonic equivalents of F♭ [(F-flat) which is by definition a diatonic semitone above E] and D (D-double sharp), amongst others.

When calculated in equal temperament with a reference of A above middle C as 440 Hz, the frequency of Middle E (E4) is approximately 329.628 Hz. See pitch (music) for a discussion of historical variations in frequency.

Designation by octave

Scales

Common scales in the key of E.
 E major: E F G A B C D E
 E natural minor: E F G A B C D E
 E harmonic minor: E F G A B C D E
 E melodic minor ascending: E F G A B C D E
 E melodic minor descending: E D C B A G F E

E major modes (diatonic scales).
 E Ionian: E F G A B C D E
 E Dorian: E F G A B C D E
 E Phrygian: E F G A B C D E
 E Lydian: E F G A B C D E
 E Mixolydian: E F G A B C D E
 E Aeolian: E F G A B C D E
 E Locrian: E F G A B C D E

E melodic (Jazz) minor modes
 E ascending melodic minor: E F G A B C D E
 E Dorian ♭2: E F G A B C D E
 E Lydian augmented: E F G A B C D E
 E Lydian dominant: E F G A B C D E
 E Mixolydian ♭6: E F G A B C D E
 E Locrian ♮2: E F G A B C D E
 E altered: E F G A B C D E

E harmonic minor modes
 E harmonic minor: E F G A B C D E
 E Locrian 6: E F G A B C D E
 E Ionian 5: E F G A B C D E
 E Dorian 4: E F G A B C D E
 E Phrygian 3: E F G A B C D E
 E Lydian 2: E F G A B C D E
 E Superlocrian bb7: E F G A B C D E

E harmonic major modes
 E Harmonic Major: E F G A B C D E
 E Dorian 5: E F G A B C D E
 E Phrygian 4: E F G A B C D E
 E Lydian 3: E F G A B C D E
 E Mixolydian 2: E F G A B C D E
 E Lydian Augmented 2: E F G A B C D E
 E Locrian 7: E F G A B C D E

F-flat

F is a common enharmonic equivalent of E, but is not regarded as the same note. F is commonly found after E in the same measure in pieces where E is in the key signature, in order to represent a diatonic, rather than a chromatic semitone; writing an E with a following E is regarded as a chromatic alteration of one scale degree.

See also
 Piano key frequencies
 E major
 E minor
 Root (chord)

Musical notes